"Walk of Life" is a song recorded by English singer Billie Piper. The song was written by Piper and Wendy Page for Piper's second studio album Walk of Life (2000). It was released as Piper's final single in December 2000 following her decision to retire from the music industry.

Critical reception
The song received mixed reviews from music critics. Yahoo! reviewer Jackie Flynn wrote that she had heard the song "a hundred times before" and compared it to "Mama" by Kim Appleby. Peter Robinson of NME wrote that "Walk of Life" "sounds nice", but "lacks the excitement" of previous singles.

Release and chart performance
"Walk of Life" was released in the United Kingdom on 11 December 2000 as a CD and cassette single. The song debuted on the UK Singles Chart on 23 December 2000 at number 25, its peak. It remained on the chart for five weeks and became the lowest-charting single of Piper's career despite heavy promotion. In Switzerland, the song debuted at number 66 on the Swiss Singles Chart on 4 February 2001. It failed to chart in Australia and New Zealand despite the previous single, "Something Deep Inside", reaching the top 20.

Track listings

UK CD1 
 "Walk of Life" – 3:49
 "Caress the Gold" – 4:56
 "Walk of Life" (Whirlwind mix) – 3:20
 "Walk of Life" (video) – 3:49

UK CD2 
 "Walk of Life" – 3:49
 "Walk of Life" (Twister radio mix) – 4:16
 "Walk of Life" (Lottie's Midnight mix) – 7:18

UK cassette single 
 "Walk of Life" – 3:49
 "Walk of Life" (Whirlwind mix) – 3:20

European CD single 
 "Walk of Life" – 3:49
 "Caress the Gold" – 4:56

Charts

References

2000 singles
2000 songs
Billie Piper songs
Innocent Records singles
Song recordings produced by Quiz & Larossi
Songs written by Wendy Page
Virgin Records singles